Ulubatlı Hasan (sometimes  misspelt as Uluabatlı Hasan), Hasan of Ulubat (1428 – May 29, 1453) was a Timarli Sipâhî in the service of Sultan Mehmed II of the Ottoman Empire who achieved legendary status as a heroic Turkish martyr at the successful Siege of Constantinople.

He was born in a small village called Ulubat (near Karacabey) in the province of Bursa.

At the age of 25 he was present at the Siege of Constantinople (April 6, 1453 – May 29, 1453). The Turks had tried to take the grand city and last stronghold of the Roman Empire several times before, but this time, under the command of Sultan Mehmed II, who was in his early twenties at the time and already showing potential of being a great military leader, it looked like victory was at hand. But despite several assaults and the severe hammering by the cannons, the great double walls of Constantinople held for 53 days.

On the early morning of the last day of the siege, May 29, after the morning prayers, the Ottoman military band started to play one of their songs and the city was stormed. Ulubatlı Hasan was among the first to climb the walls of Constantinople followed closely by thirty of his friends. He carried only an Ottoman kilij, a small shield and the Ottoman Flag. He climbed the wall, under showers of arrows, stones, spears and bullets.  He reached the top and he placed the flag, which he defended until his 12 remaining friends arrived. After that he collapsed with 27 arrows still in his body. Seeing the Ottoman flag inspired the Ottoman troops and kept their spirits up – and conversely, disheartened the Greek defenders – until finally the Ottomans did conquer Constantinople.

In popular culture
 Hasan of Ulubat was played by Turan Seyfioğlu in Turkish film İstanbul'un Fethi (1951)
 İbrahim Çelikkol plays Hasan in Turkish film Fetih 1453 (2012). In the film, there is a romance between him and fictional character named Era (Dilek Serbest).

See also
 Fall of Constantinople
 Mehmed II
 Sipahi
 Lake Uluabat

References

Hasan, Ulubatli
Hasan, Ulubatli
Hasan, Ulubatli
Deaths by arrow wounds
Fall of Constantinople
Ottoman people of the Byzantine–Ottoman wars